Darrell Jackman (31 May 1921 – 5 April 1991) was an Australian cricketer. He played five first-class matches for Tasmania between 1947 and 1951.

See also
 List of Tasmanian representative cricketers

References

External links
 

1921 births
1991 deaths
Australian cricketers
Tasmania cricketers
Cricketers from Hobart